Sir John Prescott Hewett  (25 August 1854 – 27 September 1941) was a British Indian civil servant who served as Lieutenant Governor of the United Provinces of Agra and Oudh and later as a Conservative MP for Luton.

Early life
Hewett was born in Barham, Kent, son of Rev. John Hewett, vicar of Babbacombe, Torquay, and his wife, Anna Louisa Lyster, daughter of Captain William Hammon and Mary Bellingham. Hewett was older brother of Rear Admiral George Hayley Hewett RN, his father Rev. John Hewett was the nephew of Sir Prescott Gardner Hewett, 1st Baronet and the first-cousin of Vice-Admiral Sir William Nathan Wrighte Hewett. He was educated at Winchester College and Balliol College, Oxford.

Biography 

Hewett joined the Indian Civil Service in 1875 and worked in Agra, Bulandshahr and Mathura. He enjoyed travel and hunting in the Himalayan terai and later wrote on his hunting. In 1898 he was a member of the Indian plague commission. In 1902 Lord Curzon posted him as acting chief commissioner to the Central Provinces. He was involved in famine relief during 1907 and was knighted in the same year. He was posted lieutenant governor of the United Provinces of Agra and Oudh in the same year and helped develop industry in the region. He was keen on vocational education and obtained funds for establishing an agricultural college in Kanpur and organized a trade exhibition in 1910. He was a conservative who preferred Indian peasants as workers rather than be swayed by Western-educated Indians in the Indian National Congress. He tried to persuade John Morley to go slow on reforms to allow Indians in the civil service. In 1911 he was relieved from his position as governor and sent to Delhi to organize the coronation durbar of King George V and Queen Mary. He retired in 1912, but continued to invest in tea and rubber companies across the colonies. He served as the founding chairman of the governing body of the School of Oriental and African Studies in London. In 1918 he was sent to Mesopotamia to examine the move to a civilian rule there. He angered Lord Montagu by speaking to the army officers there against the proposed reform and removal of military rule. He became the Member of Parliament for Luton as a Unionist in 1922, but lost it in 1923. He continued to make hunting trips to India.

Personal life
Hewett married Ethel Charlotte, daughter of Henry Binny Webster in 1879. They had three children:

 Mabel Ada Hewett, married Anthony Courage in July 1903 in St George's, Hanover Square
 Colonel Henry Micklam Prescott Hewett of the 1st Royal Dragoons
 Lorna Ethel Hewett

He wrote Jungle Trails in Northern India (1938) which was autobiographical in which he appeared to avoid mention of his wife. Lord Curzon had suggested conflict in the household. His daughter Lorna, undertook a trek in Ladakh in 1921 and was a keen outdoors woman was featured in his book. Hewett died at his home The Court House, Chipping Warden and was buried there.

References

Sources
Craig, FWS British Parliamentary Election Results 1885-1918
Whitaker's Almanack, 1923 and 1924 editions

External links 
Jungle trails in Northern India reminiscences of hunting in India (1938)

Conservative Party (UK) MPs for English constituencies
Politics of Luton
1854 births
1941 deaths
Indian Civil Service (British India) officers
Knights Grand Commander of the Order of the Star of India
Knights Commander of the Order of the British Empire
Companions of the Order of the Indian Empire